Claudio Botosso (born 28 March 1958) is an Italian actor. He appeared in more than forty films since 1985.

Selected filmography

References

External links 

1958 births
Living people
Italian male film actors